WJBW (1000 AM, Radio Azure) is a radio station broadcasting an ethnic Haitian format. Licensed to Jupiter, Florida, United States, the station is currently owned by Jhonson Napoleon, through licensee WJBW LLC.

History
The station went on the air as WMLZ on September 23, 1992. On August 14, 1997, the station changed its call sign to WJBW. On April 13, 1999, it changed to WDBE. On April 14, 2001, it changed yet again to WDBF. On November 6, 2001, it reverted to the current WJBW as it did from 1997 to 1999.

According to the FCC's Silent AM Broadcast Station Lists, WJBW 1000 has been silent/off the air since July and remains silent since September 2017.

WJBW was once the sister station to WJBW-FM at 99.5. The call sign referred to its early to mid-90s on-air positioning as "The Jukebox," which carried a locally programmed automated nostalgia music and classic standards format.

WJBW-FM is now known as WLLY-FM and broadcasts a Mexican/Latin format in the Palm Beaches and is owned and operated by the Glades Media Group.

References

External links

Haitian-American culture in Florida
JBW
Radio stations established in 1992
1992 establishments in Florida